Du Plassis Pass is situated in the Western Cape province of South Africa, on the Regional road R327 (Western Cape) between Mossel Bay and Herbertsdale.

Mountain passes of the Western Cape